Fazal Sheikh (born June 27, 1965 in New York City) is an artist who uses photographs to document people living in displaced and marginalized communities around the world.

Life and career
Fazal Sheikh is an artist who uses photographs to document people living in displaced and marginalized communities around the world. His principle medium is the portrait, although his work also encompasses personal narratives, found photographs, archival material, sound, and his own written texts. He works from the conviction that a portrait is, as far as possible, an act of mutual engagement, and only through a long-term commitment to a place and to a community can a meaningful series of photographs be made. His overall aim is to contribute to a wider understanding of these groups, to respect them as individuals and to counter the ignorance and prejudice that often attaches to them.

Frequently collaborating with local communities around the world, Sheikh has engaged long-term projects in Africa, Afghanistan, India, and in Israel/Palestine. As part of his practice, and in order to create a dialogue surrounding substantive human rights issue, Sheikh offers most of his projects online free of charge.

Fazal Sheikh was born in New York City, 1965, and attended Princeton University, graduating in 1987. Sheikh's work first came to prominence with his work in the Rwandan, Sudanese, Ethiopian, Somali, and Mozambican refugee camps of his father's homeland, Kenya, and throughout eastern and southern Africa. Early exhibitions from his first monograph, A Sense of Common Ground, were held in New York City at the International Center of Photography and Pace/MacGill Gallery. His second long-term project, The Victor Weeps, explored the legacy of war in Afghanistan as Sheikh followed the trajectory of his family heritage back to the lands in northern India where his grandfather was born, and from where he would later migrate to Kenya at a time before the partition of India in 1947, when the region would become Pakistan.

In the following years, exhibitions were held internationally at venues which include Tate Modern, where his work was included in the landmark "Cruel and Tender" survey exhibition of 20th Century photography which traveled to the Museum Lugwig, Cologne, Germany (2003). Sheikh's work has been exhibited in solo exhibitions at the Fotomuseum Winterthur, the Henri Cartier-Bresson Foundation, Paris, which awarded him the Henri Cartier-Bresson Grand Prize in 2005, the Sprengel Museum, Germany, and the Nelson-Atkins Museum of Art. In 2008 Sheikh's work was included in Okwui Enwezor's, Archive Fever: Uses of the Document in Contemporary Art exhibition at the International Center of Photography in New York City.

In 2009 the Mapfre Foundation, Spain, organized a mid-career retrospective and publication that opened in Madrid and traveled to the Huis Marseille, Amsterdam; the Museum of Art, Bogota; and Sala Rekalde, Bilbao.

In 2015, at the end of four years working in Israel and Palestine, Sheikh produced The Erasure Trilogy, a set of books and exhibitions which explores the anguish caused by the loss of memory—by forgetting, amnesia or suppression—and the resulting human desire to preserve memory, all seen through the prism of the Israeli-Palestinian conflict.

Sheikh then worked in collaboration with Eyal Weizman on The Conflict Shoreline, a publication in response to Sheikh's "Desert Bloom’ series which explored the historical, legal, and archival underpinnings of the land claims of the Bedouin community of Al-‘Araqib, the ‘unrecognized’ village at the threshold of the Negev desert which has been demolished more than 70 times in the ongoing "battle over the Negev." The Conflict Shoreline was submitted as evidence for the NGO Zochrot's project on transitional justice, the Truth Commission on the responsibility of Israeli society for the events of 1948–1960. In 2015, Eduardo Cadava, the author and Princeton scholar, who has written extensively on Sheikh's work in the past, published the monograph, Erasures, in response to The Erasure Trilogy.

Awards
J. William Fulbright Foundation Fellowship to Kenya, 1992
National Endowment for the Arts Fellowship, 1994
New Jersey State Council on the Arts Fellowship, 1994
Infinity Award, International Center of Photography, 1995
Leica Medal of Excellence, 1995
Ruttenberg Award, 1995
Ferguson Award, 1995
Le Prix d’Arles, Dialogue de l'Humanité, 2003 
MacArthur Fellows Program, 2005
, 2005
Soros Foundation / Open Society Institute Distribution Award, 2007
Prix Nadar (Ladli, special mention), 2007
Deutscher Fotobuchpreis (shortlist, Ladli), 2007
Deutsche Börse Photography Prize (finalist), 2008
Lucie Foundation Humanitarian Award, 2009
Deutscher Fotobuchpreis (The Circle), 2009
John Simon Guggenheim Memorial Foundation Fellowship, 2012

Various Exhibitions 
 1996 Fazal Sheikh: A Sense of Common Ground, International Center of Photography, New York City 
 1998 Fazal Sheikh: A Sense of Common Ground, Sprengel Museum, Hannover
 1999 Fazal Sheikh: The Victor Weeps, Fotomuseum Winterthur
 2000 Fazal Sheikh – The Victor Weeps, The Art Institute of Chicago
 2002 Fazal Sheikh: The Victor Weeps – Afghanistan, Zimmerli Art Museum, New Jersey 
 2003 Cruel and Tender, The Real in the Twentieth-Century Photograph, Tate Modern, London 
 2003 Fazal Sheikh: A Camel for the Son – Ramadan Moon – The Victor Weeps, Davis Museum and Cultural Center
 2004 Fazal Sheikh, The United Nations, New York City
 2005 After the Fact, Martin-Gropius-Bau, Berlin
 2007 Fazal Sheikh – Moksha and Ladli – HCB Award Winner 2005, Henri Cartier-Bresson Foundation, Paris 
 2008 Deutsche Börse Photography Prize, Photographer’s Gallery, London
 2008 Archive Fever: Uses of the Document in Contemporary Art International Center of Photography
 2009 Fazal Sheikh, Fundación Mapfre, Madrid, Spain 
 2009 Fazal Sheikh, Huis Marseille Museum for Photography, Amsterdam 
 2009 Beloved Daughters – Photographs by Fazal Sheikh, Nelson-Atkins Museum of Art             
 2010 Fazal Sheikh Museo de Arte de Banco de la República, Bogotá
 2010 The Image in Question: War – Media – Art, Carpenter Center for the Visual Arts, Harvard University 
 2012 Fazal Sheikh – Ether, Pace/MacGill Gallery, New York City 
 2014 Now You See It: Photography and Concealment, Metropolitan Museum of Art, New York City        
 2016 Fazal Sheikh, – Independence | Nakba, Pace/MacGill Gallery, New York City
 2016 This Place, Brooklyn Museum of Art

Publications
A Sense of Common Ground (Scalo Publishers),  
The Victor Weeps (Scalo, 1998), 
A Camel for the Son (IHRS and Steidl, 2001), 
Ramadan Moon (IHRS and Steidl, 2001), 
Moksha (IHRS and Steidl, 2005), 
Un Chameau Pour Le Fils (Photo Poche Societé, Actes SUD, 2005), 
Ladli, Steidl, 2007, 
The Circle, Steidl, 2008, 
Fazal Sheikh (Mapfre Foundation, 2009), 
Portraits (Steidl, 2011), 
Ether (Steidl, 2013), 
The transformation of the world depends upon you (with W. Ewald, T. Keenan, and M. Saxton; Steidl, 2013), 
The Erasure Trilogy (Steidl, 2015), 
 
The Conflict Shoreline: Colonization as Climate Change in the Negev Desert, Eyal Weizman (Göttingen: Steidl and Cabinet Books, 2015). 
Human Archipelago (with Teju Cole, Steidl, 2018), 
The Moon Is Behind Us (with Terry Tempest Williams, Steidl, 2021),

Collections 
 J. Paul Getty Museum, Los Angeles
 Stedelijk Museum, Amsterdam
 Metropolitan Museum of Art, New York City
 International Center of Photography, New York City
 Henri Cartier-Bresson Foundation, Paris
 International Museum of Photography and Film, Rochester
 Los Angeles County Museum of Art
 Museum Folkwang, Essen
 Fotomuseum Winterthur
 Philadelphia Museum of Art
 Yale University Gallery of Art, New Haven
 San Francisco Museum of Modern Art
 Art Institute of Chicago
 National Gallery of Art, Washington DC
 Museum of Fine Arts, Houston
 National Museum of Kenya, Nairobi
 Sprengel Museum, Hannover
 Mapfre Foundation, Madrid
 Library of Congress, Washington DC

External links 
 Steidl: https://steidl.de/Artists/Fazal-Sheikh-0518284350.html
 Pace/MacGill Gallery: http://www.pacemacgill.com/selected_works/artist_page.php?artist=Fazal%20Sheikh
 John Simon Guggenheim Memorial Foundation: http://www.gf.org/fellows/all-fellows/fazal-sheikh/
 John D. and Catherine T. MacArthur Foundation: https://www.macfound.org/fellows/770/
 Tate Modern: http://www.tate.org.uk/whats-on/tate-modern/exhibition/cruel-tender/artists/fazal-sheikh
 Nelson-Atkins Museum of Art: https://web.archive.org/web/20100703113732/http://www.nelson-atkins.org/art/Exhibitions.cfm?id=77
 Henri Cartier-Bresson Foundation: http://www.henricartierbresson.org/en/expositions/fazal-sheikh-winner-2005-hcb-award/
 Deutsche Börse Photography Prize 2008: 
 This Place: http://www.this-place.org/photographers/fazal-sheikh/
 Lucie Foundation: https://web.archive.org/web/20150927080021/http://www.lucies.org/honorees/fazal-sheikh/
 Zochrot Truth Commission: http://zochrot.org/en/keyword/45328

1965 births
American photographers
Artists from New York City
MacArthur Fellows
Living people
Princeton University alumni